Yvon Rivard (born August 20, 1945 at Sainte-Thècle, Quebec) is a Canadian writer from Quebec. He is a two-time Governor General's Award winner, receiving the Governor General's Award for French-language fiction in 1986 for Les silences du corbeau, and the Governor General's Award for French-language non-fiction in 2013 for Aimer, enseigner.

He was a longtime professor of creative writing at McGill University until his retirement in 2008.

He won the Grand Prix du livre de Montréal in 1996 for his novel Le Milieu du jour. As a screenwriter, he received a Genie Award nomination for Best Adapted Screenplay at the 13th Genie Awards in 1992 for Phantom Life (La Vie fantôme), cowritten with Jacques Leduc.

Works
 Pierre Vadeboncœur, un homme libre (1974)
 Mort et naissance de Christophe Ulric (1976)
 Frayère (1976)
 L'Imaginaire et le quotidien (1978)
 Les Silences du corbeau (1986)
 Le Bout cassé de tous les chemins (1993)
 Le Milieu du jour (1995)
 L'Ombre et le Double (1996)
 Le Siècle de Jeanne (2005)
 Personne n'est une île, (2006)
 Une idée simple (2010)
 Aimer, enseigner (2012)

References

1945 births
20th-century Canadian novelists
20th-century Canadian poets
21st-century Canadian novelists
Canadian male novelists
Canadian male poets
Canadian male screenwriters
Canadian novelists in French
Canadian poets in French
Canadian screenwriters in French
Academic staff of McGill University
Writers from Montreal
French Quebecers
Governor General's Award-winning fiction writers
Governor General's Award-winning non-fiction writers
Living people
20th-century Canadian male writers
21st-century Canadian male writers
Canadian male non-fiction writers
20th-century Canadian screenwriters
21st-century Canadian screenwriters